Francesco Lomonaco (22 November 1772 – 1 September 1810) was an Italian writer. Known as the "Italian Plutarch", he was a precursor to and a main proponent of the Italian unification.

References

1772 births
1810 deaths
Italian male writers
People from the Province of Matera
Italian exiles
People of the Parthenopean Republic